3 Geminorum is a blue supergiant star in the constellation Gemini.  It is a small amplitude pulsating variable and a close double star, with a mean combined apparent visual magnitude of about 5.7.

3 Geminorum was found to be an α Cygni variable in 1998 and given the designation PU Geminorum.  It varies by a few tenths of a magnitude with a main period of 6.807 days and a secondary period of 25 days.

3 Geminorum is also a close double star.  The brighter component is the variable blue supergiant.  The companion is 2.5 magnitudes fainter.  The separation is about 0.6 arc-seconds.  There is also a much fainter, approximately 14th magnitude, star 14" away.

Faint Hα emission lines have been detected in the spectrum of 3 Geminorum, but this is not usually expressed in published spectral classifications.  An "e" is only occasionally appended to the spectral type to reflect the emission lines.  3 Geminorum has frequently been classified as a normal supergiant (luminosity class Ib), although a bright supergiant (Ia) luminosity class is now preferred.

3 Geminorum can be occulted by the Moon.  Observations of these occultations can give information about the angular diameter of a star, or about close companions.  Occultations of 3 Geminorum have been observed, but no double or diameter information has been published.

References

Gemini (constellation)
042087
Alpha Cygni variables
Geminorum, 03
2173
Geminorum, PU
BD+23 1226
029225
B-type supergiants